Ilya Anatolyevich Kubyshkin (born 12 January 1996) is a Russian football player who plays for FC Volga Ulyanovsk.

Club career
He made his debut in the Russian Football National League for FC Zenit-2 St. Petersburg on 27 March 2016 in a game against FC Luch-Energiya Vladivostok.

References

External links
 Profile by Russian Football National League

1996 births
Footballers from Saint Petersburg
Living people
Russian footballers
Russia youth international footballers
Association football midfielders
FC Zenit-2 Saint Petersburg players
FC Slovan Liberec players
FC Avangard Kursk players
FC Neftekhimik Nizhnekamsk players
FC SKA Rostov-on-Don players
FC Tom Tomsk players
FC Urozhay Krasnodar players
FC Volga Ulyanovsk players
Russian First League players
Russian Second League players
Czech First League players
Russian expatriate footballers
Expatriate footballers in the Czech Republic
Russian expatriate sportspeople in the Czech Republic